The following list includes settlements, geographic features, and political subdivisions of Wisconsin whose names are derived from Native American languages.

Listings

Counties

 Chippewa County – the Ojibwe (or Chippewa) people
 City of Chippewa Falls
 Iowa County – the Iowa people
 Kenosha County – Kenosha (ginoozhe), an Ojibwe word meaning "pike" (fish)
 City of Kenosha
 Kewaunee County – for either a Potawatomi word meaning "river of the lost" or an Ojibwe word meaning "prairie hen", "wild duck" or "to go around"
 Manitowoc County – Manitowoc (manidoowag) is an Ojibwe word meaning "spirits"
 City of Manitowoc
 Menominee County – the Menominee people
 Milwaukee County – Algonquin word Millioke which means "The Good Land", or "Gathering place by the water". Another interpretation is "beautiful or pleasant lands".
 City of Milwaukee
 City of South Milwaukee
 Oneida County – named after the Oneida people.
 Outagamie County – the Outagamie (Meskwaki, Fox) people
 Ozaukee County – Ozaukee (Ozaagii) is the Ojibwe word for the Sauk people
 Sauk County – named after the Sauk people.
 Sauk City
 Saukville
 Waukesha County – Potawatomi word meaning "little foxes"
 City of Waukesha
 Waupaca County – Menominee word meaning "white sand bottom" or "brave young hero"
 Waushara County – a Native American word meaning "good earth"
 Winnebago County – named after the Winnebago people.

Settlements

 Algoma
 Altoona
 Amnicon Falls
 Aniwa
 Antigo
 Arkansaw
 Ashippun
 Ashwaubenon
 Astico
 Aztalan
 Baraboo
 Carcajou
 Catawba
 Chetek
 Chenequa
 Chicago Junction
 Chippecotton, modern-day Racine (so-named Chippecotton or Kipiwaki, meaning "root"; Racine is French for "root")
 Coloma
 Couderay
 Dakota
 Horicon
 Huron
 Iola
 Kaukauna (named for early French settler pronunciation "Kakalin," and later Grand Kakalin, bastardized either from Menomonee Ogag-kane or O-gau-gau-ning, meaning "the place where fish stop" due to the massive amounts of fish they found where the river fell 52 feet beneath the falls. Because of the forceful rushing rapids, travelers were forced to carry their canoes around it)
 Kegonsa
 Kekoskee
 Keshena
 Kewaskum
 Kinnickinnic
 Koshkonong
 Koshkonong Mounds
 Lake Koshkonong
 Lake Nebagamon
 Lake Wisconsin
 Lake Wissota
 Manawa
 Manitowish Waters
 Mazomanie
 Menasha (from a Menominee phrase meaning "thorn in the island")
 Menomonee Falls
 Menomonie
 Mequon
 Merrimac
 Minnesota Junction
 Minocqua
 Misha Mokwa
 Mishicot
 Monona
 Moquah
 Mosinee
 Mukwonago (from Potowatomi, meaning "a ladle/bend in the stream")
 Muscoda
 Muskego
 Nashotah
 Niagara
 Necedah
 Neda
 Neenah (from Winnebago Neenah, meaning "running water")
 Nekoosa
 Neopit
 Neosho
 Neshkoro
 Oconomowoc (from Potowatomi, meaning "waterfall")
 Oconto
 Oconto Falls
 Odanah
 Ogema
 Okauchee Lake
 Onalaska
 Ono
 Ontario
 Oshkosh – Menominee Chief Oshkosh, whose name meant "claw" (cf. Ojibwe oshkanzh, "the claw").
 Osseo
 Otsego
 Penokee
 Peshtigo
 Pewaukee
 Pokegama
 Potosi
 Poy Sippi
 Poynette
 Requa
 Shawano
 Sheboygan (of obscure but likely Algonquian origins, it may derive from Shawb-wa-way-kum, meaning either "thundering under the ground" or "path between the lakes"; bastardized through French Cheboigan)
 Sheboygan Falls
 Sioux
 Suamico
 Tamarack
 Taycheedah
 Tichigan
 Tomahawk
 Viroqua
 Wabeno
 Waubeka
 Waucousta
 Waukesha (originally known by local tribes as Tshee-gas-cou-tak, meaning "burnt, fire-land", possibly later derived from Ojibwe Wagosh meaning "fox", or alternatively from a Chief "Leatherstrap" or "Wau-tsha", met by the early white settler Morris Cutler, who honored him with the namesake)
 Waumandee
 Waunakee – Waunakee is called Wanąǧi [wa-na-GHEE] in the Hocąk language, meaning "spirit", as in a spirit which has departed from the body. I was told by a tribal colleague that it was given this name due to the spirits who can sometimes be heard there at night, singing. Wanąǧi is attested in other Wisconsin place names as well: Wanąǧi Homįk ("where the spirit lies" or "cemetery") is the Hocąk name for Reesburg, WI.
 Waupaca
 Waupun (meaning "east, daybreak, dawn")
 Wausau (from Chippewa, meaning "far away")
 Wausaukee
 Wautoma
 Wauwatosa
 Weyauwega
 Winneboujou
 Winneconne
 Wisconsin Rapids
 Wonewoc
 Wyocena
 Wyoming (community)
 Wyoming, Iowa County
 Wyoming, Waupaca County
 Yuba

Bodies of water

 Ahnapee River
 Allequash Lake
 Amnicon Falls
 Amnicon River
 Aztalan State Park
 Baraboo River
 Big Muskellunge Lake
 Chequamegon-Nicolet National Forest
 Chequamegon Waters Flowage
 Cherokee Marsh  – named after the Cherokee people.
 Chequamegon Bay
 Chicago Bay, Lake Chippewa
 Lake Chippewa
 Chippewa Falls
 Chippewa River (Wisconsin)
 Couderay River
 Lake Gogebic
 Gogebic Range
 Lake Horicon
 Horicon Marsh
 Iola Lake
 Lower Kaubashine Lake
 Upper Kaubashine Lake
 Lake Kawaguesaga
 Lake Kegonsa
 Kentuck Lake
 Kewaskum Woods
 Kickapoo River
 Kickapoo Woods
 Kinnickinnic River (Milwaukee River)
 Kinnickinnic River (St. Croix River)
 Koshkonong Mounds
 Lake Koshkonong
 Kurikka Creek
 Lenawee Creek
 Lake Leota
 Linnunpuro Creek
 Little Muskie Lake
 Machickanee Flowage
 Manitou Island (Wisconsin)
 Manitowish Lake
 Manitowoc River
 Maunesha River
 Mawikwe Bay
 Mecan River
 Lake Mendota
 Menominee Creek
 Little Menominee River
 Menominee River
 Michigan Island
 Milwaukee Bay, Lake Chippewa
 Milwaukee Bay, Lake Michigan
 Milwaukee River
 Lake Minocqua
 Minong Flowage
 Misha-Mokwa (Mother Bear) Trail
 Moccasin Lake
 Lake Mohawksin
 Lake Monona
 Muskego Lake
 Little Muskego Lake
 Musky Bay, Lake Chippewa
 Nagamicka Lake
 Naga-waukee Park
 Lake Namakagon
 Namekagon River
 Lake Nebagamon
 Lower Nemahbin Lake
 Upper Nemahbin Lake
 Nemadji River
 Neopit Mill Pond
 Lake Nokomis
 Oconomowoc Lake
 Okauchee Lake
 Oneida Lake
 Papkee Lake
 Papoose Creek
 Pecatonica River
 Pesabic Lake
 Peshtigo River
 Pewaukee Lake
 Pokegama Lake
 Puckaway Lake
 Sauk Prairie
 Scuppernong Prairie
 Shawano Lake
 Sheboygan Marsh
 Sheboygan River
 Sinissippi Lake
 Sinsinawa River
 Siskiwit Bay
 Siskiwit Lake (Wisconsin)
 Siskiwit River
 Skanawan Creek
 Squaw Creek (Wisconsin)
 Squaw Lake (Wisconsin)
 Tamarack Creek
 Taycheedah Creek
 Tichigan Forest (Wildlife Area)
 Tichigan Lake
 Token Creek (Tokaunee Creek)
 Totagatic Lake
 Totagatic River
 Tourtillotte Creek
 Lake Towanda
 Lake Wandawega
 Wayka Creek
 Lake Waubesa
 Waunakee Marsh
 Waupee Lake
 Waupee Swamp
 Wauzeka Bottoms
 Lake Wingra
 Lake Winnebago
 Lake Wisconsin
 Lake Wissota
 Wyalusing Forest
 Wyona Lake
 Yahara River
 Yawkey Lake

See also
List of place names in the United States of Native American origin

References

Citations

Sources

 Bright, William (2004). Native American Placenames of the United States. Norman: University of Oklahoma Press. .

 
 
Place names